Harland Michael Williams (born November 14, 1962) is a Canadian actor, comedian and writer. After several years of stand-up in Toronto and Los Angeles he made his film debut in Dumb and Dumber (1994) before playing starring roles in the short-lived sitcom Simon (1995–96) and the Disney comedy RocketMan (1997). He co-starred in Half Baked and played a psychopathic hitch-hiker in There's Something About Mary in 1998. He later appeared in films such as The Whole Nine Yards (2000), Freddy Got Fingered (2001) and Sorority Boys (2002), and provided voices in works such as Gary & Mike, Robots (2005), Meet the Robinsons (2007), and Sausage Party (2016). He is also an author of children's books, and creator of the children's animated series Puppy Dog Pals (2017-2023).

Early life
Harland Williams was born on November 14, 1962, in Toronto, Ontario, to Lorraine Mary (née O'Donnell), a social worker and writer, and John Reesor Williams, a lawyer who served as a member of the Ontario legislature. He grew up in Toronto's Willowdale neighborhood with four sisters. He is the brother of special effects artist Steve "Spaz" Williams, and a cousin to Barenaked Ladies keyboardist Kevin Hearn.

Williams enrolled in Sheridan College in 1983, where he studied animation and media arts, while periodically working as a forest ranger at Fort Frances.

Williams gained American citizenship circa 2009.

Career
Williams began in stand-up comedy in 1984, when still at Sheridan College. He performed in Toronto for seven years before relocating to Los Angeles in 1992. He credits a 1993 appearance on Late Night with David Letterman for a break through, and Jim Carrey for bringing him to the attention of the Farrelly brothers, who cast Williams in his debut role as a police officer in Dumb and Dumber (1994).

Other film roles include Freddy Got Fingered, There's Something About Mary, Half Baked, RocketMan, Sorority Boys, Down Periscope, Superstar and Employee of The Month. He has performed his stand-up comedy routines on The Tonight Show with Jay Leno, Late Night with Conan O'Brien, HBO, Comedy Central and at comedy clubs throughout the country.

His improvisational skills led to him winning the award for 'Best Improviser' on an episode of NBC's prime time series Thank God You're Here in 2007.

Williams's ventures include voicing 'Monster' on Nickelodeon's animated series Robot and Monster and starring as Warwick the Warlock in Disney's direct-to-DVD movie Spooky Buddies.

He is the author and illustrator of several children's books, including a series about a dinosaur named Lickety Split, as well as books for adults.

He has a free, bi-weekly podcast called The Harland Highway.
 
He has appeared on Tom Green's House Tonight and on the Adam Carolla Podcast numerous times. He is known for his performance of bird sounds on Carolla's show.

In August 2012 he began filming in Vancouver a 13-part Citytv comedy series called Package Deal, in which he stars.

Williams created the Disney Junior series Puppy Dog Pals that debuted in 2017.

Filmography

Film

Television

Video games

References

External links

 

1962 births
Living people
Canadian expatriate male actors in the United States
Canadian male film actors
Canadian male television actors
Canadian male voice actors
Canadian stand-up comedians
Comedians from Toronto
Male actors from Toronto
Sheridan College alumni
20th-century Canadian male actors
21st-century Canadian male actors